Marachina is a Neotropical genus of butterflies in the family Lycaenidae.

Species
Marachina maraches (Druce, 1912)
Marachina fidelia (Hewitson, 1874)
Marachina peonida (Draudt, 1919)

References

Eumaeini
Butterflies of Central America
Lycaenidae of South America
Fauna of the Amazon
Lycaenidae genera